Giles Lawrence,  DCL was  an English Anglican priest in the 16th century.

Lawrence was born in Gloucestershire and educated at Corpus Christi College, Oxford. He was Regius Professor of Greek at Oxford from 1548 to 1553. He held livings in Minety, Chalgrove and Rickmansworth. Lawrence was Archdeacon of Wilts from 1564 to 1577; and Archdeacon of St Albans from 1581 to 1582.

Notes

Regius Professors of Greek (University of Oxford)
People from Gloucestershire
16th-century English Anglican priests
Archdeacons of Wilts
Archdeacons of St Albans
Alumni of Corpus Christi College, Oxford